Super Singer is an Indian Bengali language reality-based singing competition. It has aired on Star Jalsha since 2019. The whole series is available digitally on Disney+ Hotstar. It is designed to be a talent hunt to find the best voice of Bengal.

History

Seasons

Season 1
The first season was started as Super Singer Junior airing from 1 June 2019. The show was hosted by Rooqma Ray, a Bengali television actress and the judges were Kumar Sanu, Kaushiki Chakraborty and Jeet Ganguly. The winners of the season were Sharmishtha Debnath from Tollygunge, Kolkata and Pranjal Biswas from Karimpur, Nadia.

Season 2
The second season was started as Super Singer airing from 12 January 2020. The show was hosted by popular Bengali actor, Jisshu Sengupta and the judges were Kumar Sanu, Kavita Krishnamurti and Jeet Ganguly. After the COVID-19 lockdown in 2020, the judges were replaced by Abhijeet Bhattacharya, Rupankar Bagchi, Lopamudra Mitra and Shaan. The winner of the season was Sanchari Sengupta from Kasba, Kolkata.

Season 3
The third season was started as Super Singer Season 3 airing from 28 August 2021. The show was hosted by Jisshu Sengupta and the judges were Kumar Sanu, Kaushiki Chakraborty and Sonu Nigam. The winner of the season was Shuchismita Chakraborty from Midnapore, Paschim Medinipur.

Season 4
The fourth season was started as Super Singer Season 4 airing from 7 January 2023. The show was hosted by Jisshu Sengupta and the judges were Shaan, Monali Thakur and Rupam Islam.

Adaptations

References

External links
Super Singer Junior on Disney+ Hotstar
Super Singer on Disney+ Hotstar

Star Jalsha original programming
Bengali-language television programming in India
2019 Indian television series debuts
Indian reality television series